The men's road time trial, one of the cycling events at the 2012 Olympic Games in London, took place on 1 August over a  course in southwest London and Surrey.

Bradley Wiggins of Great Britain won the gold medal.

Qualification

Each nation in the top 15 of the 2011 UCI World Tour, top 7 of the UCI Europe Tour, top 4 of the UCI America Tour, top 2 of the UCI Asia Tour and leaders of the UCI Oceania and Africa Tours qualified to have one rider in the race. In addition, ten nations gained an extra rider through the performance of their riders in the 2011 UCI World Time Trial Championships; these were Germany, Great Britain, Switzerland, Australia, Netherlands, Kazakhstan, Denmark, Spain, Sweden and Canada. The United States were given an extra rider at the expense of Luxembourg, who were not represented in the race.

Pre-race favourites
The defending champion in this discipline was Fabian Cancellara of Switzerland. He was expected to mount a strong challenge, but crashed heavily in the closing stages of the Olympic road race, initially putting his participation in the time trial in doubt. Scans revealed that he had avoided breaking his collarbone for the second time in the season, though, and he started in the time trial.

Bradley Wiggins of Great Britain was also considered a big favourite, having won seven previous time trials in the 2012 season.. Current world champion Tony Martin of Germany was tipped as an early favourite, but had suffered an injury-wrecked season, and pulled out of the Tour de France in an effort to be fit for the Olympic race.

Of the other contenders, Great Britain's Chris Froome had shown strong form at the Tour de France, where he finished second in two time trials. Michael Rogers, the 2003–2005 time trial world champion represented Australia, with 2011 Tour de France winner Cadel Evans electing not to start due to fatigue. Young American Taylor Phinney, who won the opening time trial of the 2012 Giro D'Italia represented the United States. Sylvain Chavanel was the sole French rider, along with Luis León Sánchez of Spain and Marco Pinotti, winner of a time trial in the Giro, who represented Italy.

Course

The competition consisted of a time trial over one lap of a  course, with staggered starts. Starting and finishing at the historic Hampton Court Palace, the course passed through areas of southwest London and Surrey including Esher, Kingston upon Thames, Teddington and Bushy Park.

Schedule

Results
The entry list was published on 1 August.

References

External links

Route Map 
2012 Summer Olympics – Men's road time trial at Sports Reference

Men's road race
Cycling at the Summer Olympics – Men's individual time trial
Men's events at the 2012 Summer Olympics